Lago Ravasanella is a lake in Piedmont, north-west Italy which straddles the provinces of Vercelli and Biella. At an elevation of 325 m, its surface area is 0.31 km²(0.12sq mi).

Lakes of Piedmont
Province of Vercelli
Province of Biella
Biellese Alps